Enchenopa is a genus of treehoppers in the family Membracidae. There are more than 50 described species in Enchenopa.

The genus underwent a major revision 2014, resulting in 51 species. Enchenopa binotata is a species complex made up of multiple species, often identified by their host plants.

Species
These species belong to the genus Enchenopa:

 Enchenopa albidorsa (Fairmaire, 1846)
 Enchenopa albifrons Strümpel et al., 2014
 Enchenopa amazonensis Strümpel et al., 2014
 Enchenopa andina  Schmidt, 1924
 Enchenopa ansera Funkhouser, 1943
 Enchenopa anseriformis Strümpel et al., 2014
 Enchenopa auridorsa Sakakibara & Marques, 2007
 Enchenopa beebei (Haviland, 1925)
 Enchenopa binotata (Say, 1824) (two-marked treehopper, species complex)
 Enchenopa biplaga Walker, 1858
 Enchenopa brasiliensis Strumpel & Strumpel, 2007
 Enchenopa castanea Strümpel et al., 2014
 Enchenopa concolor (Fairmaire, 1846)
 Enchenopa costaricensis  Schmidt 1924
 Enchenopa cuneata Strümpel et al., 2014
 Enchenopa curvata (Fabricius, 1803)
 Enchenopa dubia (Fowler, 1894)
 Enchenopa euniceae Rothéa & Creão-Duarte, 2007
 Enchenopa eurycephala Strümpel et al., 2014 
 Enchenopa fusca Sakakibara & Marques, 2007 
 Enchenopa gladius (Fabricius, 1803)
 Enchenopa gracilis (Germar, 1821)
 Enchenopa grandis Strümpel et al., 2014
 Enchenopa ignidorsum Walker, 1858
 Enchenopa lanceolata (Fabricius 1787)
 Enchenopa latipes (Say, 1824) (wide-footed treehopper)
 Enchenopa longicollum (Olivier, 1792)
 Enchenopa longimaculata Strümpel et al., 2014
 Enchenopa longula Strümpel et al., 2014
 Enchenopa loranthacina Sakakibara & Marques, 2010
 Enchenopa minuta Rothéa & Creão-Duarte, 2007
 Enchenopa monoceros (Germar, 1821)
 Enchenopa montana Strümpel et al., 2014
 Enchenopa multicarinata Fowler, 1894
 Enchenopa pachycornuta Strümpel et al., 2014
 Enchenopa permutata Van Duzee, 1908
 Enchenopa pichinchaensis Strümpel et al., 2014
 Enchenopa pilosa Strümpel et al., 2014
 Enchenopa pittieri Strümpel et al., 2014
 Enchenopa quadricolor Walker, 1858
 Enchenopa quadrimaculata Walker, 1858
 Enchenopa reclinata Strümpel et al., 2014
 Enchenopa recticornuta Strümpel et al., 2014
 Enchenopa richteri Strümpel et al., 2014
 Enchenopa schremmeri Strümpel et al., 2014
 Enchenopa sericea Walker, 1851
 Enchenopa serrata Strümpel et al., 2014
 Enchenopa singularis Strümpel et al., 2014
 Enchenopa squamigera (Linné, 1758)
 Enchenopa subtilis Strümpel et al., 2014
 Enchenopa vittifera  Stål, 1869

References

External links

 

Membracinae